Ahmed Touré (born 17 July 1987) is a Burkinabé professional footballer, who currently plays for the Conoglese club AS Vita as a striker. He also holds Ivorian nationality.

Career

Asante Kotoko
Touré began his career with Ivorian club Africa Sports National, before he signed with Ghanaian top–flight Glo Premier League club Asante Kotoko.

KSC Lokeren Oost-Vlaanderen
On 31 August 2008, Touré signed for Belgian club K.S.C. Lokeren Oost-Vlaanderen in the Belgium Jupiler League, and on 1 November 2008, Touré played his first match against R.A.E.C. Mons.

CS Sfaxien
In August 2010, Touré signed with Tunisian Ligue Professionnelle 1 club CS Sfaxien for the 2010–11 Tunisian Ligue Professionnelle 1 season.

Asante Kotoko (return)
In September 2011, Touré returned to the Ghanaian top–flight Glo Premier League for the 2011–12 Ghanaian Premier League season.

ASEC Mimosas
After a successful spell with Ghanaian outfit Bechem United, by scoring 13 goals for the club in 2 years, Touré then joined Ivorian club ASEC Mimosas on a 2 year deal in 2017. He scored 31 goals during his 2-year stay with the club, including scoring 18 goals in 13 matches to help them win the 2017–18 Ligue 1 (Ivory Coast) and end the season as the second top goal scorer. In his second season, he scored 12 goals in 10 league matches and scored 4 goals in the CAF Champions League with 2 goals in a Cup match.

AS Vita 
In May 2019, after his contract with ASEC Mimosas ended, he joined Congolese club AS Vita Club on a two year deal. He was signed to replace Jean Marc-Makusu who joined RS Berkane of Morocco in March. In June 2020, he parted ways with club after a mutual termination of his contract.

Medeama 
In January 2021, he returned to Ghana and signed for Tarkwa-based club Medeama SC. He joined them on a 2-year deal during the 2020–21 season. The deal was reportedly worth $20,000. On his return to the GPL, he scored a brace on his debut on 21 February 2021 to help Medeama to a 2–1 victory over Elmina Sharks. His first goal came in the 3rd minute which was the fastest goal in the first round of the 2020–21 season.

Honours

Club 
Asante Kotoko

 Ghana Premier League: 2007–08, 2011–12, 2013–14
 Ghanaian FA Cup: 2013–14

ASEC Mimosas

 Côte d'Ivoire Premier Division: 2017–18

Individual 
 GPL Player of the Year: 2010–11

References

External links 
 Profile at Sporting Lokeren
 Profile at Footgoal
 NFT Profile

1987 births
Living people
Sportspeople from Ouagadougou
Burkinabé footballers
Burkina Faso international footballers
Association football forwards
ASEC Mimosas players
Asante Kotoko S.C. players
Belgian Pro League players
K.S.C. Lokeren Oost-Vlaanderen players
CS Sfaxien players
AS Vita Club players
Burkinabé expatriate footballers
Burkinabé expatriate sportspeople in Ghana
Burkinabé expatriate sportspeople in Belgium
Burkinabé expatriate sportspeople in Tunisia
Burkinabé expatriate sportspeople in Egypt
Expatriate footballers in Ghana
Expatriate footballers in Belgium
Expatriate footballers in Tunisia
Expatriate footballers in Egypt
Ivorian expatriate sportspeople in Belgium
Ivorian expatriate sportspeople in Tunisia
21st-century Burkinabé people